Kagome may refer to:

 Kagome lattice, a two-dimensional lattice pattern found in the crystal structure of many natural minerals
 Kagome crest, a star shaped symbol related to the lattice design and present in many Shinto shrines
 Kagome Kagome, a popular children's game in Japan
 Kagome Higurashi, the female protagonist in the manga and anime series InuYasha
 Kagome Co., Ltd., a food and beverage company in Japan